Pentanitroaniline, sometimes called hexyl, is an explosive organic compound. It is a relatively sensitive explosive (much more so than TNT) that can be used as a base charge for detonators, although it is uncommon in this application.

Pentanitroaniline can be reacted with ammonia in benzene, dichloromethane or another similar solvent to produce triaminotrinitrobenzene (TATB), an insensitive high explosive, used in nuclear bombs and other critical applications.

Pentanitroaniline is regulated by the United States Department of Transportation (DoT) as a "forbidden explosive" that is too dangerous to transport over public thoroughfares or by air.

References 

Nitrobenzenes
Anilines